La diosa de Tahití (The Goddess of Tahiti) also known as Los chacales de la Isla Verde (The Jackals of Isla Verde), is a Mexican drama film directed by Juan Orol. It was released in 1953 and starring Rosa Carmina and Arturo Martínez.

Plot
Paula (Rosa Carmina), the biggest star of a cabaret located on some exotic island of the South Seas, harbor a fugitive who starts a dangerous adventure that compromises her safety, in a bitter struggle between smugglers and military.

Cast
 Rosa Carmina ... Paula
 Arturo Martínez ... Silvestre
 Marco de Carlo ... Alfredo
 Gilberto González ... Pancho

Reviews
Delirious romantic melodrama directed by Juan Orol, which include the pleasant musical numbers danced by the rumbera Rosa Carmina and the recreation exotic environments in which the filmmaker puts his history.

References

External links
 

1953 films
Mexican black-and-white films
Rumberas films
1950s Spanish-language films
Films directed by Juan Orol
Mexican drama films
1953 drama films
1950s Mexican films